Cory Taylor Rasmus (born November 6, 1987) is an American former professional baseball pitcher. He has played in Major League Baseball (MLB) for the Atlanta Braves and Los Angeles Angels.

Professional career

Atlanta Braves
Rasmus was drafted by the Atlanta Braves in the first round of the 2006 Major League Baseball Draft out of Russell County High School. The Braves added him to their 40-man roster after the 2012 season.

Rasmus played for the Triple-A Gwinnett Braves until he was called up to the Braves on May 18, 2013. He made his major league debut on May 22, 2013, working one and two-thirds innings, and striking out three while giving up home runs to Aaron Hicks and Oswaldo Arcia.

On May 27, 2013, Cory pitched to his older brother Colby Rasmus for the first time in an MLB game. Colby hit a double. This was the first time that one brother pitched to another brother in the MLB since June 13, 2010.

He was optioned back to Gwinnett on May 29 when Jordan Walden was activated from the disabled list.

Los Angeles Angels of Anaheim / Los Angeles Angels
On July 29, 2013, Rasmus was traded to the Los Angeles Angels of Anaheim for Scott Downs. He was then optioned to the Triple-A Salt Lake Bees. He was called up on August 23.

Rasmus started the 2014 season at Triple-A Salt Lake.  He was recalled by the Angels on May 5. After being called up, Rasmus shifted between the bullpen and the rotation, spot starting in 6 games for the Angels. As a starter, he averaged less than 5 innings in each start. He finished the season with a 2.57 ERA in 30 games, 6 starts for the Angels. Between the 2015 and 2016 season, Rasmus hasn't shown the same level of success from his 2014 season. On July 6, 2016, it was announced by the team that Rasmus would need core muscle surgery, effectively ending his season. Rasmus was designated for assignment on November 7. After clearing waivers, he was assigned to Triple-A. Rasmus rejected his minor league assignment and became a free agent on November 16.

Tampa Bay Rays
On February 1, 2017, Rasmus signed a minor league contract with the Tampa Bay Rays. He was released on April 7, 2017.

Personal
Rasmus is the younger brother of retired center fielder Colby Rasmus. Both brothers played for Phenix City National Little League during the 1999 Little League World Series. Phenix City won the United States championship game, before losing in the finals to Osaka, Japan, 5–0. His younger brother, Casey, was a catcher in the St. Louis Cardinals' organization until retiring in June 2014. His father Tony was drafted by the Angels in 1986, playing three seasons of minor league baseball before retiring.

References

External links

1987 births
Living people
Baseball players from Columbus, Georgia
Baseball players from Alabama
Major League Baseball pitchers
Atlanta Braves players
Los Angeles Angels players
Gulf Coast Braves players
Danville Braves players
Myrtle Beach Pelicans players
Rome Braves players
Lynchburg Hillcats players
Mississippi Braves players
Phoenix Desert Dogs players
Gwinnett Braves players
Salt Lake Bees players
Orem Owlz players